Pahkasika (Finnish for "warthog") was a Finnish adult humour magazine, edited by Markku Paretskoi and published from 1975 to 2000.

Unlike the British adult humour comic Viz and the Nordic adult humour magazine Pyton/Myrkky, Pahkasika did not include much pornography despite sometimes very ribald jokes. Instead it focused more on such things as alcoholism, family crises, xenophobia and other negative aspects of adult life, all presented in a humorous way that appeared deceptively child-friendly. Some of the jokes in the magazine were almost indistinguishable from articles in a mainstream magazine.

Recurring strips in Pahkasika included:
 Miihkali, a kindergarten-aged boy whose parents are nearly always having a crisis, either with him or with each other, but usually Miihkali doesn't understand what is going on at all.
 Pahkeinen, an old man with a nihilistic attitude to life, and his alcoholic dog who sometimes acts as a guide dog.
 Peräsmies, a parody of Superman (called Teräsmies in Finland), a superhero who could fly by farting loudly due to eating canned pea soup contaminated by an explosion at a nuclear plant.
 Vanhat herrat, two men engaging on adventures, accompanied with relatives and friends all dressed up in black suits or in similar fashion as the two men.
 Hemmo Paskiainen, a wildchild in his early teens who hangs out with his friends Stegu and Löka drinking beer, smoking cigarettes and terrorizing other people, especially his father Armas and characters like priests and fine ladies.
 Armas Paskiainen, father of Hemmo Paskiainen. These strips take place in the same universe with Hemmo Paskiainen, but perspective is the father's. Common themes include unsuccessful attempts of fatherhood, cheating Hemmo's mother, eating pills, drinking alcohol, committing suicide and dying.
 Hyvä sinä, short and absurd strips drawn with a distinctive style by Teemu Suviala with a signature "Mies Suviala".
 Kolme Rumaa Teroa, ("Three Ugly Teros") three-frame strips of three guys causing pain and harm to people in various ways. Their usual victims are best categorized as being "politically correct" people.

The magazine also featured irregular articles such as photomanipulations and a course in foreign languages, with all the example phrases having a subtly different (and more humorous) meaning. The magazine also featured regularly lists of one-liner puns. Parodies of different mail-order catalogues were also popular. The mail order catalogues usually had a common theme for all the stuff that was offered. For example, computer games for the elderly -catalog had a molotov cocktail joystick for Winter War veterans. Recurring theme was also imaginary magazines, couple of pages laid out in a way to resemble some other magazine than Pahkasika. These usually made fun of a particular theme. Examples of the sub-magazines include "Kakka" ("poop" in Finnish), parodying zombies as a popular culture theme and "Luksus" ("luxury" in Finnish), making fun about fashionable high society lifestyle magazines. The latter featured a most likely fictitious short interview with the rock singer Juice Leskinen.

References
 Pahkasian kustantaja (1985–2000): Banana Press Oy

1975 establishments in Finland
2000 disestablishments in Finland
Adult humour titles
Defunct magazines published in Finland
Finnish humour
Finnish-language magazines
Humor magazines
Magazines established in 1975
Magazines disestablished in 2000